Henry Towneley Green R.I.  (1836–1899) was a British watercolourist and illustrator who exhibited from 1855 at the Royal Academy and the New Society of Painters in Watercolours. He became a member of the New Watercolour Society in 1879. He was the brother of Charles Green R.I. (1840–1898), a leading illustrator for The Graphic. The two brothers produced illustrations for Once a Week, and the Cornhill Magazine, edited by Thackeray, and regular contributed to by Millais and Leighton. Some of Green's work is held at the Victoria and Albert Museum.

References

1836 births
1899 deaths
19th-century British painters
British male painters
British illustrators
19th-century British male artists